Bangli Regency is the one and only landlocked regency (kabupaten) of Bali, Indonesia. It covers an area of 520.81 km2 and had a population of 215,353 at the 2010 Census and 258,721 at the 2020 Census. Its regency seat is the town of Bangli.

Up until 1907, Bangli was one of the nine kingdoms of Bali.   The capital has a famous Hindu temple, the Pura Kehen, which dates from the 11th century. Bangli also has one village, lies surround a hill, Demulih.

Geography
The northern part of the district includes the main road to the north coast passing through Kintamani and around the crater in which Gunung Batur sits.

From the Demulih hill, Bali Island, particularly its southern part can be seen – Kuta, Nusa Dua, Gianyar and a part of Klungkung.

Bangli is the only regency in Bali which is landlocked.

Administrative districts

The Regency is divided into four districts (kecamatan), listed below from south to north with their areas and their populations at the 2010 Census and the 2020 Census. The most northern district - Kintamani - occupies over 70% of the regency's area and has 43.5% of its population. The table also includes the number of administrative villages (rural desa and urban kelurahan) in each district, and its postal codes.

Climate
Bangli has a tropical monsoon climate (Af) with moderate rainfall from April to October and heavy rainfall from November to March.

References

External links